McGill Motorsports was a NASCAR Busch Series team owned by John and Nancy McGill. It fielded the No. 36 Chevy for a few years.

The team debuted in 2003 as DCT Motorsports with Steve Grissom driving the No. 61 Chevrolet in three races. For their final two races of the season they changed their number and ran the No. 36 Chevrolet. DCT would post its best finish of the season at Richmond, a 14th-place finish. In 2004, Steve Grissom and Travis Geisler shared the driving duties at the start of the season. Grissom left the team in May 2004 and Geisler took over full-time driving duties for the team. Stanton Barrett drove in the last three races of the season. Grissom had the best finish of the year for the team, when he finished 11th at Rockingham.

For the 2005 season, Stanton Barrett returned to the team and ran the first 26 races with DCT. T. J. Bell then took over the car for eight races and Tim Sauter ran the final race of the season. Barrett gave DCT its first ever top ten finish when he finished 10th at New Hampshire. That would also be the best finish for the team during the year.  In 2006, the team changed their name to McGill Motorsports and Sauter returned to drive the full schedule. Lester Buildings also joined the team as the primary sponsor for 25 races. Sauter ran 23 races but did not finish in the top ten.  In August, Max Papis and Jeff Green filled in for Sauter, who claimed that McGill was punishing him for a rules infraction earlier in the month. He left the team with three races to go in the season. and Papis and Brent Sherman finished out the final two races of the season. Sherman drove for the team full-time in 2007 with sponsorship from Big Lots, but after failing to finish in the top-ten, resigned from the team. He was replaced by ARCA RE/MAX Series driver Jeremy Clements starting at Charlotte. After the season, team crew chief Ricky Pearson told the press that McGill would not participate in the 2008 season due to a lack of sponsorship. They will sell of their remaining equipment on July 8, 2008

References

External links 
Official Website

Auto racing teams established in 2003
Sports clubs disestablished in 2007
American auto racing teams
Companies based in South Carolina
Defunct NASCAR teams
Defunct companies based in South Carolina